Kentucky Route 461 (KY 461) is a  state highway in the U.S. state of Kentucky. The highway connects mostly rural areas of Pulaski and Rockcastle counties with Mount Vernon.

Route description

Pulaski County
KY 461 begins at an interchange with KY 80 (Hal Rogers Parkway) southeast of Mark, within the central part of Pulaski County. It travels to the north-northwest and curves to the northeast. It crosses over Flat Lick Creek and then passes Bobbitt Cemetery. It intersects the western terminus of KY 1677 (Tommy Road). It then intersects the southern terminus of KY 3268 (Old Mt. Vernon Road) before traveling through Valley Oak. It crosses over Buck Creek and then crosses over Latham Branch twice. The highway curves to the north-northeast and intersects the eastern terminus of KY 934 before it enters Rockcastle County.

Rockcastle County
KY 461 has an intersection with both the western terminus of KY 1152 (Blue Springs Road) and the eastern terminus of KY 3273. It then curves to the northeast and crosses over Browne Fork and then the West Fork Skegg Creek. The highway curves to the north-northeast and intersects the southern terminus of KY 1250 (Sand Springs Road) and then the southern terminus of KY 2549 (White Rock Road). It curves to the northeast and intersecting U.S. Route 150 (US 150; New Brodhead Road / Crab Orchard Road). KY 461 then enters Mount Vernon. It intersects KY 1326 (Old Brodhead Road). The highway temporarily leaves the city limits and curves to the east-northeast. When it re-enters the city, it meets its northern terminus, an intersection with US 25 (Richmond Street).

Major intersections

See also

References

0461
Transportation in Pulaski County, Kentucky
Transportation in Rockcastle County, Kentucky